Shankill railway station serves Shankill, in Dún Laoghaire–Rathdown, Ireland.

History and facilities 
The current Shankill station opened on 10 June 1977. It was upgraded in 1983 to cater for the new electrified DART trains.

The station has two through platforms connected via a footbridge with lifts. The ticket office is currently unmanned. Wheelchair access for trains towards Bray is on the opposite side of the station to the main entrance, access for services towards Dublin city centre is by ramp at main entrance. Two ticket vending machines are available and sell all DART and Commuter tickets as well as LEAP cards.

From the inception of the Dublin Area Rapid Transit (DART) service in 1984, all DART services stop at Shankill.

Transport services 
The station is directly served by one Go-Ahead Ireland 45B bus route from Kilmacanogue to Dún Laoghaire.

A number of Dublin Bus routes also serve the station.

The station provides a car park for commuters.

See also 
 List of railway stations in Ireland
 Rail transport in Ireland

External links
Irish Rail Shankill Station website

References

Iarnród Éireann stations in Dún Laoghaire–Rathdown
1977 establishments in Ireland
Railway stations opened in 1977
Railway stations in the Republic of Ireland opened in the 20th century